Church of the Immaculate Conception is a church and parish located in Pulau Tikus, George Town, Penang, Malaysia. The church was founded in 1811 and is the second oldest church in the diocese after Church of the Assumption.

History

The church was founded in 1811 by Fr. John Baptist Pasqual, from Phuket in Thailand. Fr. Pasqual landed in Pulau Tikus and decided to build a church. Fr. Jacques-Honore Chastan, served as the fourth parish priest in the church from 1830 to 1833. He left for Korea to do his missionary work. He was persecuted by the Korean authorities for protecting the Korean Catholics. Pope John Paul II in 1984 canonised him.

The original church building lasted until 1835 when it was replaced with a brick church. On the adjoining a boys' school, St. Xavier's Branch School and Pulau Tikus Convent was constructed nearby. In 1899, due to the collapse of one of the ceilings in the church, it was rebuilt. The church survived until the late 1960s when it was further renovated until the facade today.

Currently, the church serves about 5,000 Catholics residing around the north and north-east zone of Penang Island. The church is led by Fr. Jude Miranda since October 2018. It also administers the Chapel of St. Joseph, located in Hong Seng Estate, Mount Erskine.

Mass Times
Daily Masses  
7:00am English (Monday, Tuesday & Wednesday) 
6:00pm English (Thursday & Friday)

Saturday Masses  
Novena: 5:00pm English  
Sunset Mass: 6:00pm English

Sunday Masses 
8:30am English 
11:15am Tamil (1st and 3rd Sundays only) 
11:30am Bahasa Malaysia (all Sundays) 
6:00pm English

See also
Catholic Church in Malaysia

References

External links

 Official Site
 Penang Diocese Official Website

1811 establishments in the British Empire
Roman Catholic churches in Penang
Tourist attractions in George Town, Penang